Mazher Sayed is an Indian Actor. A veteran of Indian television industry for over two decades, he has done many roles in various Hindi television shows. He is well known for his portrayal of Anish in Ekta Kapoor's popular hit thriller series Kaahin Kissii Roz that aired from 2001-04 on Star Plus. He is currently seen as Inspector in Crime Patrol solving Crime & Murder Cases.

Early life 

He studied at Jamnabai Narsee School and graduated from Mithibai College with a bachelor's degree in commerce.

Career 

Sayed started his career with the popular show Kaahin Kissii Roz. He started doing theatre shows at an early age and worked with veterans like Salim Ghouse, Kader Khan, and Atul Kumar.

He went on to do shows such as Kuch Jhuki Palkien, and Kamini Damini with Hema Malini. He also appeared in Saat Phere, Kahani Ghar Ghar Ki, Rakt Sambandh and Chajje Chajje Ka Pyaar. In 2013 he was seen in Colors' show Mrs. Pammi Pyarelal.

He did episodes for Saavdhaan India and Crime Patrol. He was a participant in reality dance show Nach Baliye season four with actress and wife Mouli Ganguly.

He also appeared in commercials for Colgate, Castrol GTX, and others.

He played the main male lead role of Prem Rajendra Bharadwaj in Sasural Simar Ka on Colors TV.

Personal life 
He married his co-star from Kaahin Kissii Roz, Mouli Ganguly, in 2010. He is also the co-owner of an event management company called Gyan Productions.

Television

References

External links

Indian male television actors
Living people
Male actors from Mumbai
Actors from Mumbai
Year of birth missing (living people)